The 1975 Nationals was the first Women's Nationals.  The Nationals was a team handball tournament to determine the National Champion from 1975 from the US.

Venues 
The championship was played at the Ohio State University in Columbus, Ohio.

Modus 

The two teams played a championship series with four games.

Results 
Source:

Final ranking 
Source:

Women's Open ranking

Women's College ranking

References 

USA Team Handball Nationals by year
USA Team Handball College Nationals by year
Ohio State Buckeyes